Washington Township is one of the fourteen townships of Lawrence County, Ohio, United States. As of the 2010 census the population was 239.

Geography
Located in the far northern part of the county, it borders the following townships:
Jefferson Township, Jackson County - north
Greenfield Township, Gallia County - east
Symmes Township - southeast
Decatur Township - south
Bloom Township, Scioto County - west

The unincorporated community of Firebrick is located in Washington Township.

Name and history
It is one of forty-three Washington Townships statewide.

Government
The township is governed by a three-member board of trustees, who are elected in November of odd-numbered years to a four-year term beginning on the following January 1. Two are elected in the year after the presidential election and one is elected in the year before it. There is also an elected township fiscal officer, who serves a four-year term beginning on April 1 of the year after the election, which is held in November of the year before the presidential election. Vacancies in the fiscal officership or on the board of trustees are filled by the remaining trustees.

Education 
Washington Township's education services (K-12), are provided, for the most part, by the Oak Hill Union Local School District. A smaller portion of the township is provided services from the Rock Hill Local School District, which offers Pre-K through 12th grades.

References

External links
County website

Townships in Lawrence County, Ohio
Townships in Ohio